At the 1948 Summer Olympics, seven fencing events were contested, six for men and one for women.

Medal summary

Men's events

Women's events

Medal table

Participating nations
A total of 294 fencers (255 men and 39 women) from 30 nations competed at the London Games:

References

 
1948 Summer Olympics events
1948
1948 in fencing
International fencing competitions hosted by the United Kingdom